Steven Antony Sylvester (born 26 September 1968) is a former English cricketer and is now a Chartered Psychologist and Associate Fellow of the British Psychological Society (BPS). Sylvester was a right-handed batsman who bowled left-arm fast-medium. He was born in Chalfont St Giles, Buckinghamshire. Based in Buckinghamshire, Sylvester has been married to his wife Claudia Sylvester for 25 years and together they have four children. Sylvester also played Academy Football for Oxford United in the early 1980s, and played against Chelsea U18's at Stanford Bridge in the Youth FA Cup under the guidance of Maurice Evans and Dave Fogg.

Sylvester made his first-class debut for Middlesex against Glamorgan in the 1991 County Championship. He made 4 further first-class appearances for the county, the last of which came against the touring Pakistanis in 1992. In his 5 first-class matches, he took 4 wickets at an average of 80.00, with best figures of 2/34. He made his List A debut for Middlesex against Minor Counties in the 1992 Benson & Hedges Cup. He made a further List A appearance for Middlesex, against Surrey in the same competition. He took a single wicket in these matches, at a cost of 83 runs.

In the season he made his debut for Middlesex, he also made his debut for Buckinghamshire in the Minor Counties Championship against Cheshire. In 1993, he made a single List A appearance for Nottinghamshire against Lancashire in the 1993 AXA Equity & Law League. The following season, he appeared in a single first-class match for Nottinghamshire against Oxford University. In this match, he scored 6 unbeaten runs in Nottinghamshire's first-innings, while in their second-innings he wasn't required to bat. With the ball, he took the wicket of Greg Macmillan in the Oxford first-innings for the cost 38 runs from 17 overs, while in their second-innings he bowled 5 wicket-less overs for the cost of 19 runs. He continued to play Minor counties cricket for Buckinghamshire, before leaving the county at the end of the 1996 season, having made 6 Minor Counties Championship and 2 MCCA Knockout Trophy appearances.

He joined Hertfordshire in 1997, making his debut for the county in the MCCA Knockout Trophy against Lincolnshire. He played Minor counties cricket for Hertfordshire from 1997 to 1999, playing 11 Minor Counties Championship matches and 4 MCCA Knockout Trophy matches. He first appeared in List A cricket for Hertfordshire against the Leicestershire Cricket Board in the 1999 NatWest Trophy. He made 3 further List A appearances for the county, the last of which came against Cambridgeshire in the 2000 NatWest Trophy. In his 4 matches, he took 3 wickets at an average of 46.00, with best figures of 2/31.

He retired from professional cricket in 1994. Master's degree in psychology, a Chartered Psychologist (CPsychol.) with the British Psychological Society (BPS). He has now achieved the status of Associate Fellow (AFBPsS) within the British Psychological Society (BPS) for his contribution to psychology. He is also a Registered Practitioner Psychologist with the Health & Care Professions Council (HCPC). Sylvester is a published Author with his first book Detox Your Ego published by Headline Publishing Group in 2016. Sylvester is currently writing his second book that will be released as part of a series.

References

External links
 Steve Sylvester at ESPNcricinfo
 Steve Sylvester at CricketArchive

1968 births
Living people
People from Chalfont St Giles
English cricketers
Middlesex cricketers
Buckinghamshire cricketers
Nottinghamshire cricketers
Hertfordshire cricketers
English psychologists
Sports psychologists
Oxford United F.C. players
Hachette (publisher) books
Sheffield United F.C.
AFC Wimbledon non-playing staff
Middlesex County Cricket Club
Association footballers not categorized by position
English footballers